Sansha Town (三沙镇) is a town under the jurisdiction of Ningde City, Xiapu County in Fujian Province, China.

Sansha is located in the Fujian Sheng province, in the southeastern part of the country, 1,500 km south of Beijing. Sansha is located at 41 meters above sea level, and has 36,918 inhabitants. The population consists of 17,865 females and 19,053 males. 14.0% of the population are children under the age of 15, 76% adults aged 15-64, and 8.0% of the elderly population over 65.

The land around Sansha is mostly hilly, but to the south it is flat. To the southeast, the sea is closest to Sansha. The highest point in the vicinity has an elevation of 516 meters and is 2.3 km northwest of Sansha. Sansha is the largest town in the area. In the region around Sansha, islands are unusually common.

The climate is temperate. The average temperature is 18°C. The warmest month is August, at 24°C, and the coldest February, at 9°C. The average rainfall is 1,950 millimeters per year. The wettest month is June, with 274 millimeters of rain, and the driest October, with 71 millimeters.

Administrative divisions
Sansha Town has a total of 4 communities and 27 administrative villages.

Communities
Center Community
Wu'ao Community
Dong'ao Community
Xi'ao Community

Villages
Center Village
Wuwo Village
Dongwo Village
Xiwo Village
Sanwo Village
Sanxiang Village
Jinyang Village
Guzhen Village
Beacon Village
Longtou Village
Dongshan Village
Fushan Village
Sanping Village
Shishi Nose Village
Xiaohao Village
Caiyang Village
Shandu Village
Gubang Village
Yu Gongting Village
Dongbi Village
Daluting Village
Badu Village
Erkeng Village
Jinji Village
Huazhu Village
Qingguansi Village
Qingguan Lan Village

Notable people
The former Secretary General of the State Council, Du Xinyuan, is a native of Sansha Town.

Language and culture
Sansha Township Minnan Dialect is the area closest to the southern Fujian mainland where the Minnan dialect is spoken.

Notes

References

Township-level divisions of Fujian